The Stolen Valor Act of 2013 is a United States federal law that was passed by the 113th United States Congress. The law amends the federal criminal code to make it a crime for a person to fraudulently claim having received a valor award specified in the Act, with the intention of obtaining money, property, or other tangible benefit by convincing another that he or she received the award.

The law is a revised version of a previous statute with roughly the same name that had been struck down by the Supreme Court of the United States in United States v. Alvarez. In that case, the Supreme Court ruled the arrest and prosecution of a citizen for wearing and claiming to have received unearned military awards, who did so without criminal intent, under the 2005 law violates their constitutional right to freedom of speech.

Provisions of the bill
This summary is based largely on the summary provided by the Congressional Research Service, a public domain source.

The Stolen Valor Act of 2013 amends the federal criminal code to rewrite provisions relating to fraudulent claims about military service to subject to a fine, imprisonment for not more than one year, or both for an individual who, with intent to obtain money, property, or other tangible benefit, fraudulently holds himself or herself out to be a recipient of:
 Medal of Honor
 Distinguished Service Cross
 Navy Cross
 Air Force Cross
 Silver Star
 Bronze Star
 Purple Heart
 Combat Action Ribbon
 Combat Infantryman's Badge
 Combat Action Badge
 Combat Medical Badge
 Combat Action Medal
 Or any replacement or duplicate medal for such medal as authorized by law.

Congressional Budget Office report

H.R. 258 makes changes to the current federal offenses relating to fraudulent claims about military service. As a result, the government might be able to pursue cases that it otherwise would not be able to prosecute. CBO expects that H.R. 258 would apply to a relatively small number of additional offenders, however, so any increase in costs for law enforcement, court proceedings, or prison operations would not be significant. Any such costs would be subject to the availability of appropriated funds.

Because those prosecuted and convicted under H.R. 258 could be subject to civil and criminal fines, the federal government might collect additional fines if the legislation is enacted. Civil and criminal fines are recorded as revenues. Criminal fines are deposited in the Crime Victims Fund and later spent. CBO expects that any additional revenues and direct spending would not be significant because relatively few cases would likely be affected.

Procedural history

House
The Stolen Valor Act of 2013  was introduced by Rep. Joe Heck (R-NV) on January 15, 2013. It was referred to the United States House Committee on the Judiciary and the United States House Judiciary Subcommittee on Crime, Terrorism, Homeland Security and Investigations.  On May 20, 2013, the House voted to pass the Stolen Valor Act of 2013 by 390–3 in Roll Call Vote 161.

Senate
The Stolen Valor Act of 2013 was received in the United States Senate on May 21, 2013.  It passed the Senate by unanimous consent on May 22, 2013.

Presidential signature
The bill was signed into law by President Barack Obama on June 3, 2013.

Government Reactions to Stolen Valor Act Legal Challenges
Justice Anthony Kennedy's opinion in United States v. Alvarez cited that "a Government-created database" is "at least one less speech-restrictive means by which the Government could likely protect the integrity of the military award system." In his view, "were a database accessible through the Internet, it would be easy to verify and expose false claims." In response, President Obama announced the creation of the DoD valor database, or valor.defense.gov in July 2012, saying "this week, we will launch a new website, a living memorial, so the American people can see who’s been awarded our nation’s highest honors . . . because no American hero should ever have their valor stolen.” This database and the 2013 revision of the Stolen Valor Act were the Obama administration's dual response to the Alvarez case.

See also
 List of bills in the 113th United States Congress
 List of acts of the 113th United States Congress
 Awards and decorations of the United States military
 Mitchell Paige, Medal of Honor recipient who later tracked imposters
 Stolen Valor, book by B. G. Burkett and Glenna Whitley chronicling phony Vietnam veterans.
 Don Shipley, retired Navy SEAL who exposes fraudulent claims of military service
 John Kerry military service controversy

Notes/References

External links

 Library of Congress – Thomas H.R. 258
 beta.congress.gov H.R. 258
 GovTrack.us H.R. 258
 OpenCongress.org H.R. 258
 WashingtonWatch.com H.R. 258
 House Republicans' report on H.R. 258
 Congressional Budget Office's report on H.R. 258

Acts of the 113th United States Congress
Military awards and decorations of the United States